Education in the United Kingdom is a devolved matter with each of the countries of the United Kingdom having separate systems under separate governments. The UK Government is responsible for England, whilst the Scottish Government, the Welsh Government and the Northern Ireland Executive are responsible for Scotland, Wales and Northern Ireland, respectively.

For details of education in each country, see:
 Education in England
 Education in Northern Ireland
 Education in Scotland
 Education in Wales

In 2018, the Programme for International Student Assessment, coordinated by the OECD, ranked the overall knowledge and skills of British 15-year-olds as 13th in the world in reading, literacy, mathematics, and science. The average British student scored 503.7, compared with the OECD average of 493.

In 2014, the country spent 6.6 percent of its GDP on all levels of education – 1.4 percentage points above the OECD average of 5.2 percent. In 2017, 45.7 percent of British people aged 25 to 64 attained some form of post-secondary education. 22.6% of British people aged 25 to 64 attained a bachelor's degree or higher. 52% of British people aged 25 to 34 attained some form of tertiary education, about 4% above the OECD average of 44%.

Stages
In each country there are five stages of education: early years, primary, secondary, further education (FE) and higher education (HE). The law states that full-time education is compulsory for all children between the ages of 5 (4 in Northern Ireland) and 16. In England, compulsory education or training was extended to 18 in 2015. This full-time education does not need to be at a school and some parents choose to home educate. Before they reach compulsory school age, children can be educated at nursery if parents wish; the four governments all provide some form of universally available education for children from the age of three years old. Further education is non-compulsory, and covers non-advanced education which can be taken at further (including tertiary) education colleges and higher education institutions (HEIs). The fifth stage, higher education, is study beyond A levels or BTECs (and their equivalent) which, for most full-time students, takes place in HEIs such as universities and colleges.

The National Curriculum, established in 1988, initially provided a framework for education in England and Wales between the ages of 5 and 18. Although the curriculum is compulsory, some private schools, home educators and (in England) academies and free schools design their own curricula. 

Following devolution in 1999, the Welsh Government took responsibility for education in Wales and the curriculum began to differ from that of England. The National Curriculum for Wales was established and is now being succeeded by the Curriculum for Wales.

In Scotland, the equivalent is the Curriculum for Excellence. Scotland's qualifications system of National 4/5s, Highers and Advanced Highers are very similar to Advanced Subsidiary (AS) and Advanced Level (A2) courses in England.

The Northern Ireland Curriculum is a separate system.

Further education

Further education (FE) refers to post-secondary education in England and Wales. FE covers a wide curriculum of study and apprenticeships, including A-levels, BTEC, NVQ, and others, ranging from entry level to top level (3, equivalent to A level) that leads to higher education. The sixth form is post-16 study taken after completing GCSE (General Certificate of Secondary Education) at school; academic further education are generally offered by sixth form colleges or by 11–18 schools with an attached sixth form. Further education colleges generally provide a wider curriculum and more vocational education, although not limited to it. Tertiary colleges provide both academic and vocational courses.

Higher education

In the United Kingdom, higher education is offered by universities and other institutions (colleges, institutes, schools, and academies) and includes both research-oriented and higher professional education. Universities provide programmes that lead to a degree (bachelor's, master's, or doctorate) and non-degree programmes that lead to a vocational qualification such as a certificate or diploma. British higher education is valued around the globe for its quality and rigorous academic standards. Several British universities are ranked among the top universities in the world, including the University of Cambridge, the University of Oxford, Imperial College London, and UCL.

Entry qualifications
Students who sit for GCSEs usually take 9 or more subjects, requiring 20 to 25 examinations. Most students take Maths, English literature, English language and double science, totalling 5 GCSEs, plus a variety of other subjects. Sitting at the exam culminates the end of 11 years of mandatory education. A General Certificate of Secondary Education (GCSE) is awarded for each subject passed and World Education Services issues a high school diploma after the evaluation of a minimum of three GCSEs. Pre-university education in the United Kingdom is a two-year senior secondary programme that leads to a new round of examinations, the General Certificate of Education, Advanced Level (also known as GCE A-levels). As with the GCSE, students who sit for the exam choose the subjects and the number of examinations (the average number taken is three). WES awards undergraduate credit based on the nature and number of subjects passed. Each university has their own set of admission policies and the minimum entry requirements for each particular higher education programme that they offer. The General Certificate of Education Advanced Level (GCE "A Levels") is an entry qualification for universities in the United Kingdom and many other universities across the world. Students that are interested in pursuing higher education will usually enrol in pre-university and further education programmes. Similarly, with the GCSE, students who take the exam choose their subjects of interest and the number of examinations. Most students take three subjects on average and the WES grants undergraduate credit based on the nature and number of subjects passed. Bachelor's degrees at the bare minimum typically require two to three GCE A Level passes, and a minimum number of GCSE passes with a grade C or above.

Vocational
Technical and vocational education in the United Kingdom is introduced during the secondary school years and goes on until further and higher education. Secondary vocational education is also known as further education. It is separate from secondary education and doesn't belong to the category of higher education. Further education incorporates vocational oriented education as well as a combination of general secondary education. Students can also go on to a further education college to prepare themselves for the Vocational Certificate of Education (VCE), which is similar to the A-levels. Major provider of vocational qualifications in the United Kingdom include the City and Guilds of London Institute and Edexcel. Higher National Certificates and Higher National Diplomas typically require 1 and 2 years of full-time study and credit from either HNE or Diplomas can be transferred toward an undergraduate degree. Along with the HNC and HND, students who are interested in other vocational qualifications may pursue a Foundation degree, which is a qualification that trains people to be highly skilled technicians. The National Apprenticeship Service also offers vocational education where people at ages of 16 and older enter apprenticeships in order to learn a skilled trade. There are over 60 different certifications can be obtained through an apprenticeship, which typically lasts from 1 to 3 years. Trades apprentices receive paid wages during training and spend one day at school and the rest in the workplace to hone their skills.

T Levels are a technical qualification being introduced between Autumn 2020 and 2023. They are intended to provide the knowledge and experience needed for learners to progress to skilled employment, further study or a higher apprenticeship.

Teachers
Research by Education Support Partnership suggests that 75% of school teachers and college lecturers suffer from work-related stress. Increased work pressure from marking and exam targets lead some teachers to work 12 hours a day. Many are leaving the profession due to stress. The government has missed its targets for recruiting secondary school teachers seven years in a row.  Notably too few maths, science, physics, chemistry, computing and foreign language teachers were recruited. Department of Education figures show in 2019 there were 85% of the secondary school teachers required.  Schools recruited 43% of the physics teachers needed in 2019 after 47% in 2018, 64% of maths teachers needed were recruited in 2019 after 71% in 2018.  29,580 postgraduate trainees were recruited in England in 2019, a rise of only 365 further teachers, although secondary-school pupils will increase rapidly over the coming few years. The DfE expects a rise of almost 15% in secondary school pupils by 2027, adding roughly 400,000 pupils in English state secondary schools. Kevin Courtney of the National Education Union said, “Pupil numbers in state-funded secondary schools have already risen by almost 150,000 since 2014 and will rise by a further third of a million pupils over the next five years.  Even where trainee targets have been met, recruitment to initial teacher training courses is just the very start. New teachers need dedicated support to help them develop into competent professionals. Once we have invested in their skills, we must not lose their passion and experience.”  Courtney maintains not enough is done to retain newly recruited teachers and a third leave the profession within five years.

Inequality
In 2018 The Guardian commented that successful schools tend to choose pupils from high–achieving backgrounds. Pupils from disadvantaged backgrounds, and challenging pupils, tend to be concentrated in schools that do less well in inspections. Also that children from prosperous backgrounds are more likely to be in good or outstanding schools while disadvantaged children are more likely to be in inadequate schools. The inequality gap as of 2015 is closing with more students in good or outstanding schools from all social backgrounds. On the other hand, reports have also shown that during the 2010–2020 decade, the spending gap between state and private schools doubled.

A 2016 report by the Equality and Human Rights Commission said that racial inequality exists in the Great Britain education system. It was found that 6% of Black school leavers went on to attend a Russell Group university, compared with 12% of mixed race and Asian school leavers, and 11% of white school leavers. In 2009, it was found that white students' predicted A-Level grades were 53% accurate, whilst Black students' received predicated grades that were 39.1% accurate. Black students are also the most likely to receive under-predicted grades by their teachers. It was found that 7.1% of Black students received higher actual grades compared to 6.6% of White students, 6.5% of Asian students and 6.1% of Mixed students. In 2018, of all teachers in state-funded schools in England, 14.1% were from BAME groups. 33.5% of primary school and 31.3% of secondary school pupils in England were from BAME groups.  In 2021 it was claimed that white school pupils who are eligible for free school meals do less well than the overall figure for pupils so eligible.

Mental health and its effects in schools
Mental health problems among young people in UK schools are increasing; social media, pressure from schools, austerity and gender expectations are blamed. Teachers' leaders say they feel overwhelmed and cannot cope. Sarah Hannafin of the headteachers' union NAHT, said, "There is a crisis and children are under increasing amount of pressure … Schools have a key role to play and we are doing what we can, but we need more funding." Louise Regan of the National Education Union stated, "Teachers are overwhelmed by the sheer number of students showing signs of mental health problems." She added counsellor and pastoral support had been seriously reduced, though money for children's wellbeing was desperately needed, she said, "There is more focus on attainment measures rather than overall concern about the wellbeing of a child." Norman Lamb said the UK was in an "intolerable crisis", children had just one childhood and one education. "When it's gone, it's gone, and that will leave a lifetime of damage … We are failing an entire generation of young people." There were calls for a change in school culture with a switch of focus from exams to wellbeing. All pupils will be taught about mental and physical wellbeing from 2020.

Funding
In 2015/16, the UK spent £3.2 billion on under-5s education, £27.7 billion on primary education, £38.2 billion on secondary education and £5.9 billion on tertiary education. In total, the UK spent £83.4 billion on education (includes £8.4 billion on other categories).

International students 
Schools and universities in Britain are popular destinations for students of other nations. The country’s universities and colleges have educated many heads of state and government around the world, rivalled only by the United States.

See also

 Education in England
 Education administration in the United Kingdom
 Examination boards in the United Kingdom
 Faith school
 Home education in the United Kingdom
 Preparatory school (United Kingdom)
 Public school (United Kingdom)
 Special education in the United Kingdom
 Teachers' trade unions in the United Kingdom
 Universities in the United Kingdom

References

Further reading

External links 
Department for Education at the UK government
Studies from the Office for National Statistics regarding Children, Education and Skills
 Information on education in United Kingdom, OECD – Contains indicators and information about United Kingdom and how it compares to other OECD and non-OECD countries
 Diagram of British education systems, OECD – Using 1997 ISCED classification of programmes and typical ages.

Education in the United Kingdom
United Kingdom
Childhood in the United Kingdom
Adolescence in the United Kingdom